Zacharias is a small town in North Kivu in eastern Democratic Republic of the Congo. It is located just to the south of Mbunia.

External links
Maplandia World Gazetteer
Populated places in North Kivu